This is a list of 100 species in Ambrosiodmus, a genus of typical bark beetles in the family Curculionidae.

Ambrosiodmus species

 Ambrosiodmus addendus Wood & Bright, 1992 c
 Ambrosiodmus adustus Wood & Bright, 1992 c
 Ambrosiodmus aegir Wood & Bright, 1992 c
 Ambrosiodmus albizzianus Wood & Bright, 1992 c
 Ambrosiodmus alexae Wood, 2007 c
 Ambrosiodmus alsapanicus Wood & Bright, 1992 c
 Ambrosiodmus anepotulus Wood & Bright, 1992 c
 Ambrosiodmus apicalis Wood & Bright, 1992 c
 Ambrosiodmus artegranulatus Wood & Bright, 1992 c
 Ambrosiodmus asperatus Wood & Bright, 1992 c
 Ambrosiodmus bispinosulus Wood & Bright, 1992 c
 Ambrosiodmus bostrichoides Wood & Bright, 1992 c
 Ambrosiodmus brunneipes Wood & Bright, 1992 c
 Ambrosiodmus camphorae Wood & Bright, 1992 c
 Ambrosiodmus catharinensis Wood & Bright, 1992 c
 Ambrosiodmus coffeiceus Wood & Bright, 1992 c
 Ambrosiodmus colossus Wood & Bright, 1992 c
 Ambrosiodmus compressus Wood & Bright, 1992 c
 Ambrosiodmus consimilis Wood & Bright, 1992 c
 Ambrosiodmus conspectus Wood & Bright, 1992 c
 Ambrosiodmus declivispinatus Wood & Bright, 1992 c
 Ambrosiodmus devexulus (Wood, 1978) i c
 Ambrosiodmus devexus Wood & Bright, 1992 c
 Ambrosiodmus diversipennis Wood & Bright, 1992 c
 Ambrosiodmus eichhoffi Wood & Bright, 1992 c
 Ambrosiodmus facetus Wood & Bright, 1992 c
 Ambrosiodmus ferus Wood, 1986c c
 Ambrosiodmus fraterculus Wood & Bright, 1992 c
 Ambrosiodmus funebris Wood & Bright, 1992 c
 Ambrosiodmus funereus Wood & Bright, 1992 c
 Ambrosiodmus funestus Wood & Bright, 1992 c
 Ambrosiodmus guatemalensis Hopkins, 1915b c
 Ambrosiodmus gundlachi Eggers, 1931 g
 Ambrosiodmus hagedorni Wood & Bright, 1992 c
 Ambrosiodmus himalayensis Schedl (Eggers in), 1964k c
 Ambrosiodmus incertus Wood & Bright, 1992 c
 Ambrosiodmus inferior Wood & Bright, 1992 c
 Ambrosiodmus innominatus Wood & Bright, 1992 c
 Ambrosiodmus inoblitus Wood & Bright, 1992 c
 Ambrosiodmus inopinatus Wood & Bright, 1992 c
 Ambrosiodmus katangensis Bright & Skidmore, 2002 c
 Ambrosiodmus klapperichi Bright, 1985c c
 Ambrosiodmus latecompressus Wood & Bright, 1992 c
 Ambrosiodmus lecontei Hopkins, 1915 i c b
 Ambrosiodmus lewisi Wood & Bright, 1992 c b
 Ambrosiodmus linderae Hopkins, 1915b c
 Ambrosiodmus loebli Wood & Bright, 1992 c
 Ambrosiodmus luteus Bright & Skidmore, 2002 c
 Ambrosiodmus mahafali Wood & Bright, 1992 c
 Ambrosiodmus mamibillae Wood & Bright, 1992 c
 Ambrosiodmus minor Wood & Bright, 1992 c b
 Ambrosiodmus natalensis Wood & Bright, 1992 c
 Ambrosiodmus neglectus Wood & Bright, 1992 c
 Ambrosiodmus nepocranus Wood & Bright, 1992 c
 Ambrosiodmus nigripennis Wood & Bright, 1992 c
 Ambrosiodmus nodulosus Wood & Bright, 1992 c
 Ambrosiodmus obliquecaudata Wood & Bright, 1992 c
 Ambrosiodmus obliquus (LeConte, 1878) i c
 Ambrosiodmus ocellatus Wood & Bright, 1992 c
 Ambrosiodmus opacithorax Wood & Bright, 1992 c
 Ambrosiodmus opimus (Wood, 1974) i c
 Ambrosiodmus optatus Wood & Bright, 1992 c
 Ambrosiodmus ovatus Wood & Bright, 1992 c
 Ambrosiodmus pardous Wood, 2007 c
 Ambrosiodmus paucus Wood, 1986c c
 Ambrosiodmus pellitus Wood & Bright (Schedl in), 1992 c
 Ambrosiodmus permarginatus Wood & Bright, 1992 c
 Ambrosiodmus pernodulus Schedl, 1957d c
 Ambrosiodmus pertortuosus Wood & Bright, 1992 c
 Ambrosiodmus pithecolobius Wood & Bright, 1992 c
 Ambrosiodmus pseudocitri Wood & Bright, 1992 c
 Ambrosiodmus pseudocolossus Wood & Bright, 1992 c
 Ambrosiodmus raucus Wood & Bright, 1992 c
 Ambrosiodmus restrictus Wood & Bright, 1992 c
 Ambrosiodmus rhodesianus Wood & Bright, 1992 c
 Ambrosiodmus rubricollis (Eichhoff, 1875) i c g b
 Ambrosiodmus rugicollis Wood & Bright, 1992 c
 Ambrosiodmus rusticus Wood & Bright, 1992 c
 Ambrosiodmus sakoae Wood & Bright, 1992 c
 Ambrosiodmus sandragotoensis Wood & Bright, 1992 c
 Ambrosiodmus sarawakensis Wood & Bright, 1992 c
 Ambrosiodmus scalaris Wood & Bright, 1992 c
 Ambrosiodmus semicarinatus Wood & Bright, 1992 c
 Ambrosiodmus sexdentatus Wood & Bright, 1992 c
 Ambrosiodmus signiceps Wood & Bright, 1992 c
 Ambrosiodmus signifer Wood & Bright, 1992 c
 Ambrosiodmus subnepotulus Wood & Bright, 1992 c
 Ambrosiodmus sulcatus Wood & Bright, 1992 c
 Ambrosiodmus tachygraphus (Zimmermann, 1868) i c b
 Ambrosiodmus tenebrosus Wood & Bright, 1992 c
 Ambrosiodmus tomicoides Wood & Bright, 1992 c
 Ambrosiodmus tortuosus Wood & Bright, 1992 c
 Ambrosiodmus triton Wood & Bright, 1992 c
 Ambrosiodmus trolaki Wood & Bright, 1992 c
 Ambrosiodmus tropicus Wood & Bright, 1992 c
 Ambrosiodmus trux Wood & Bright, 1992 c
 Ambrosiodmus turgidus Wood & Bright, 1992 c
 Ambrosiodmus upoluensis Wood & Bright, 1992 c
 Ambrosiodmus vaspatorius Eggers (Hagedorn in), 1923a c
 Ambrosiodmus wilderi Wood & Bright, 1992 c

Data sources: i = ITIS, c = Catalogue of Life, g = GBIF, b = Bugguide.net

References

Ambrosiodmus
Articles created by Qbugbot